Universitatea Craiova is a football club based in Craiova, that competes in Liga I, the top professional football league in Romania. The club was formed in 1948 by a group of professors and students from the University of Craiova as UNSR Craiova, and played its first official match on 5 September 1948.

Key

Key to league:
 Pos. = Final position
 Pl. = Played
 W = Games won
 D = Games drawn
 L = Games lost
 GF = Goals scored
 GA = Goals against
 Pts = Points

Key to rounds:
 C = Champion
 F = Final (Runner-up)
 SF = Semi-finals
 QF = Quarter-finals
 R16/R32 = Round of 16, round of 32, etc.
 1R/2R = First round, second round, etc.
 1Q/2Q = First qualifying round, second qualifying round, etc.
 QR = Qualifying rounds
 GS = Group stage
 PO = Play-off round

Top scorers shown in italics with number of goals scored in bold  are players who were also top scorers in Liga I that season.

Seasons

Overall
Seasons spent at Level 1 of the football league system: 31
Seasons spent at Level 2 of the football league system: 8
Seasons spent at Level 3 of the football league system: 2
Seasons spent in regional leagues: 6

References

CS Universitatea Craiova
CS Universitatea Craiova seasons
Craiova